Shelburne (Schaefer Field) Aerodrome  is located  southwest of Shelburne, Ontario, Canada.

References

Registered aerodromes in Ontario